Mary Queen of Peace Church, Pottsville is a Roman Catholic church in Pottsville, Pennsylvania. It is located at 728 North Centre Street. The current structure was built in 1929. To close its doors for mass May 14, 2021.  Building will be emptied, property to be sold.

History

Mary Queen of Peace Catholic Church, Pottsville,  was established in 1920 as a new parish under the direction of Cardinal Dougherty, Archbishop of the Philadelphia Diocese.  The new parish, organized by father George Shea was created to serve the faithful of the northern part of the city apostle and the surrounding area.  From the humble beginnings in the renovated stable on the former Seltzer property, the parish celebrated mass in a new chapel on August 15, 1920.  Dedication for the present Spanish Mission Style Church built on the same property was August 25, 1929, with Cardinal Dougherty laying the cornerstone.  From its early days until the present the parish has served as a comparison served as a focal point for many social events since 1961 the church has been a parish of the Roman Catholic Diocese of Allentown.

In July 2008, the Parish was selected to close and consolidate with Saint Patrick's Parish as a result of the Diocese of Allentown's 2008 restructuring of parishes.

On August 15, 2012, Holy Mass on the  Solemnity of the Assumption of Mary was celebrated for the first time at Mary Queen of Peace since its closure in 2008.  The church was filled to capacity with over 300 parishioners wanting to worship at the noon mass and return to the beloved Pottsville Catholic Church.

Mary Queen of Peace Parochial School
The Mary Queen of Peace Parochial School was a coeducational Catholic grade school part of the Mary Queen Parish.  The school first opened in fall 1925 after rectors of the city's two original parishes, St. John the Baptist Church, Pottsville, PA and St. Patrick's noticed that overcrowding and distance were negative factors for those residing in the Fishbach and Jalappa dential districts.  A letter written by Cardinal Dougherty in 1919 directed that a new parish be established with land being purchased at Center and Nichols Street.  The temporary location of the mission church was located at nearby Mt. Laffee.

Once the debt financing the construction of the main church and the purchasing of the rectory was established, discussions began on plans to open a parochial school as well as a convent for the Sisters of the Immaculate Heart of Mary who would serve as the faculty.  An original home in the complex was remodeled and enlarged with a second property converted into the convent.  The school opened in September 1925

After 41 years of service, the school was no longer able to meet safety standards as the building deteriorated with age.  Considerable renovations and modifications would have been needed in order for the facility to remain in compliance.  Rather than move forward with the renovations, the diocese determined demolition would be more cost effective.  Approximately 180 pupils were transferred to St. John the Baptist School on the 900 block of Howard Avenue after a meeting with Rev. Charles McNulty of Mary Queen of Peace and Rev. Francis J. Fox of St. John's.  The school was closed on June 15, 1966.

See also
List of churches in Pottsville, Pennsylvania

References

External links
https://web.archive.org/web/20040614150054/http://maryqpeace.com/

1920 establishments in Pennsylvania
Churches in Schuylkill County, Pennsylvania
Pottsville, Pennsylvania
Christian organizations established in 1920
Roman Catholic churches completed in 1929
Roman Catholic churches in Pennsylvania
Roman Catholic Diocese of Allentown
20th-century Roman Catholic church buildings in the United States